Michel Ries (born 11 March 1998) is a Luxembourgish cyclist, who currently rides for UCI ProTeam .

In October 2020, he was named in the startlist for the 2020 Vuelta a España.

Major results
2015
 2nd Time trial, National Junior Road Championships
2016
 National Junior Road Championships
1st  Time trial
1st  Road race
2017
 2nd Time trial, National Under-23 Road Championships
2018
 3rd Time trial, National Under-23 Road Championships
 9th Overall Giro Ciclistico d'Italia
 10th Overall Tour de l'Avenir
2019
 1st Stage 3 Giro della Valle d'Aosta
 7th Overall Tour de l'Avenir
 9th Overall Giro di Sicilia
2020
 1st  Time trial, National Under-23 Road Championships
2021
 2nd Time trial, National Road Championships
 7th Mont Ventoux Dénivelé Challenge
2022
 2nd Time trial, National Road Championships
 9th Giro dell'Appennino
 9th Mercan'Tour Classic

Grand Tour general classification results timeline

References

External links

1998 births
Living people
Luxembourgian male cyclists
Olympic cyclists of Luxembourg
Cyclists at the 2020 Summer Olympics